Jurm is a 1990 Indian Hindi-language action film directed by Mahesh Bhatt and produced by Mukesh Bhatt. It stars Vinod Khanna, Meenakshi Sheshadri and Sangeeta Bijlani. Salim Khan wrote the story and script. The film was a critical and commercial success and was declared a "Hit" at the box-office. It is based on the 1987 movie Someone to Watch Over Me. Meenakshi Sheshadri and Sangeeta Bijlani were both nominated at the Filmfare awards, in the Best Actress and the latter in the Best Supporting category.

Plot 
Khanna plays Shekhar Varma, a Mumbai police inspector. He is happily married to Meena (Sheshadri) and they have a school-age daughter. One day, Shekhar's police department receives a call saying that an editor, Ritesh Nandy, has come across incriminating evidence that could expose the wrongdoings of some very influential people. Ritesh is killed despite being assigned police protection.

Geeta (Bijlani) presents herself as a witness to Ritesh's death, but cannot identify his killer. When her life is threatened, Shekhar and another inspector, Pramod Kadam (Inamdar), are assigned to protect her. In the process, Shekhar and Geeta fall in love, and Shekhar's wife begins to suspect her husband is having an affair. She manages to wring a confession out of him, then promptly leaves the house and moves in with her father. In the meantime, Pramod is wounded trying to protect Geeta and is hospitalized. Shekhar discovers that Ritesh's murder is the handiwork of high-ranking police officials.

Cast 
Vinod Khanna as Inspector Shekhar Verma
Meenakshi Seshadri as Meena Verma
Sangeeta Bijlani as Geeta Sarabhai
Shafi Inamdar as Inspector Pramod Kadam
Sharat Saxena as Police Officer 
Anang Desai as Inspector Narayan 
Akash Khurana as Journalist Ritesh Nandy
Om Shivpuri as Minister Kaalewar
Jack Gaud as Anthony 
Mahesh Anand as Durjan
Girija Shankar as Police Commissioner
Gurbachan Singh as Pradhan 
Gopi Desai as Inspector Kadam's Wife

Awards 

 36th Filmfare Awards:

Nominated

 Best Actress – Meenakshi Seshadri
 Best Supporting Actress – Sangeeta Bijlani

Music 
The music was composed by Rajesh Roshan and the lyrics were written by Indeevar and Payam Sayeedi. An outstanding song from the score is the romantic duet Jab Koi Baat Bigad Jaye sung by Kumar Sanu and Sadhana Sargam but It was unofficial remake of famous old English song - 500 Miles. The song "Marne Ke Dar Se Mere Dil" was heavily inspired by Madonna's "La Isla Bonita".

References

External links 

1990 films
1990s Hindi-language films
Films scored by Rajesh Roshan
Films directed by Mahesh Bhatt